Sandeep Kumar (born 1 May 1986) is an Indian racewalker. He competed in the 50 kilometres walk event at the 2015 World Championships in Athletics in Beijing, China.

He also participated in the 2016 Rio Olympics where he finished in 35th at the 50 kilometres race walk with a time of 4:07:55. He participated in 2020 Tokyo Olympics in the 20 kilometres race walk and finished 23rd.

He currently hold the national records for both 50km and 20km race walking.In the 2022 Birmingham Commonwealth Games,he won a bronze in the men's 10,000m racewalk event.

See also
 India at the 2015 World Championships in Athletics

References

External links

1986 births
Living people
Place of birth missing (living people)
Indian male racewalkers
World Athletics Championships athletes for India
Athletes (track and field) at the 2016 Summer Olympics
Athletes (track and field) at the 2020 Summer Olympics
Athletes (track and field) at the 2014 Asian Games
Athletes (track and field) at the 2018 Asian Games
Olympic athletes of India
Athletes from Haryana
Asian Games competitors for India
Athletes (track and field) at the 2022 Commonwealth Games
Commonwealth Games bronze medallists for India
Commonwealth Games medallists in athletics
Medallists at the 2022 Commonwealth Games